Brock River may refer to:

 Brock River (Chibougamau River), a tributary of the Chibougamau River, in Eeyou Istchee Baie-James, Nord-du-Québec, Quebec
 Brock River West, a tributary of Brock River, Quebec
 Brock River North, a tributary of Brock River, Quebec
 Brock River (Missisquoi River), a tributary of the Missisquoi River, in Sutton, Quebec

See also
 Brock (disambiguation)
 River Brock, a river in Lancashire, England